Phaltan Assembly constituency of Maharashtra Vidhan Sabha is one of the constituencies located in the Satara district. This constituency presently, after delimitation of Legislative Assembly constituencies in 2008, is reserved for the candidates belonging to the SC

It is a part of the Madha (Lok Sabha constituency), along with five other assembly constituencies, namely Man  in the Satara district and Karmala, Madha, Sangole, Malsiras in the Solapur district

Members of Legislative Assembly
Key

Election results

Assembly elections 2014

See also

 List of constituencies of Maharashtra Legislative Assembly
 Phaltan

References

Assembly constituencies of Maharashtra
Satara district